Fremantle railway station is the terminus of Transperth's Fremantle line in Western Australia.

History

The original Fremantle station opened in Cliff Street on 1 March 1881 as the terminus of the Eastern Railway to Guildford via Perth. As the Eastern Railway was extended its importance grew, becoming an important hub for gold miners arriving in Western Australia via ship and then travelling to the Yilgarn and Eastern Goldfields when the line opened to Kalgoorlie in 1896.

In 1907, a new station and marshalling yards were established 300 metres to the north-east on the site of the former Fremantle Railway Workshops to better service the newly constructed Fremantle Harbour.

The station was designed by William Dartnall, Chief Engineer of Existing Lines of the Railway Department in 1905. The construction contract, at an estimated cost of £80,000, was awarded in May 1906 to S.B. Alexander and completed on 20 April 1907, with the official opening on 1 July 1907.

Originally, the station had three 150 metre platforms, one side and one island, with a subway connection and an overall roof. This had been taken out of use by the 1960s and was later demolished. Until the 1960s, passenger services continued south of Fremantle to Kwinana. A signal cabin was relocated from the eastern end of the platform to the Bennett Brook Railway in 1985.

The station closed on 1 September 1979 along with the rest of the Fremantle line. Following much public outcry and a change of government, it re-opened on 29 July 1983.

Opposite the station once lay an extensive yard. Today, only a stabling siding and dual gauge freight line that is served by trains from Cockburn to the container terminal at North Quay remain.

Restoration
The station features Donnybrook stone construction on the façade with red face brick infill panels on a Donnybrook stone plinth, in Federation Free Classical style featuring a rare example of a large train hall roof. The facade remained unpainted (except for metalwork and timberwork) until it was painted in 1950.

The station was classified by the National Trust in 1974 and entered into the Heritage Council of Western Australia's Register of Heritage Places in 2001. A rationalisation of the rail reserve in 2004 was part of a plan to revitalise the precinct. In 2005, a program of staged conservation and restoration works in line with a conservation plan prepared in 1999 commenced. This included paint removal and restoration of the main entry façade, refurbishment of most of the internal areas and an electrical upgrade to bring the station up to modern standards. In August 2011, the project was completed with the restoration of external facades of the station building.

In popular culture
Fremantle station featured in the 2006 film Last Train to Freo.

Services
Fremantle station is the terminus of Transperth's Fremantle line, with frequent services to Perth that continue through to Midland via the Midland line.

Fremantle station saw 1,481,023 passengers in the 2013–14 financial year.

Platforms

Bus routes

Stands 1–5

Stands 6–10

Stands 11–13

References

External links

Track layout SA Track & Signal
Gallery History of Western Australian Railways & Stations

Federation style architecture
Fremantle line
Heritage places in Fremantle
Listed railway stations in Australia
Phillimore Street, Fremantle
Railway stations in Perth, Western Australia
Railway stations in Australia opened in 1907
State Register of Heritage Places in the City of Fremantle
Bus stations in Perth, Western Australia